Veera Sankalpa is a 1964 Indian Kannada-language film, directed  and produced by Hunsur Krishnamurthy. The film stars Hunsur Krishnamurthy, B. M. Venkatesh, B. S. Dwarakanath and Seetharam.

The movie declares before the start that it is loosely based on the oral legends about the heroism of Lakshamana Nayaka or Yecchamma Nayaka, the loyal commander of Venkatapati Raya I. It is set in the period following the demise of the Vijayanagara Empire after the Talikota Battle when the remnants of the Aravidu dynasty ruled from Penugonda and Chandragiri near Tirupati. H. R. Bhargava was the assistant director of this movie. This was the debut movie of actress Vanisri.

Cast

Hunsur Krishnamurthy
B. M. Venkatesh
B. S. Dwarakanath
Seetharam
M. P. Shankar
Adavani Lakshmi
B. Jayashree
Kumari (Vanisri) (Rathnakumari)
Srikanth
Srirang
Vidyasagar (Rajesh)
Bangerappa
Sundar
Raghu
Master Narahari Hunsur
Ramasanjeevaiah
Lakshmi
Master Sriprasad Hunsur

Soundtrack
The music was composed by Rajan–Nagendra.

References

External links
 
 

1964 films
1960s Kannada-language films
Films scored by Rajan–Nagendra
Films directed by Hunsur Krishnamurthy